The Millville climbing salamander (Bolitoglossa cerroensis) is a species of salamander in the family Plethodontidae. It is endemic to Costa Rica. Its natural habitat is subtropical or tropical moist montane forests. It is threatened by habitat loss.

References

Bolitoglossa
Endemic fauna of Costa Rica
Taxonomy articles created by Polbot
Amphibians described in 1952